Lozna is a commune in Botoșani County, Western Moldavia, Romania. It is composed of two villages, Lozna and Străteni. Until 2003, these belonged to Dersca Commune, when they were split off.

References

Communes in Botoșani County
Localities in Western Moldavia